Noana valley (dialect of Primiero and Italian language: val Noàna) is an uninhabited valley (because in the winters is very cold) in eastern Trentino, Italy. It ends in Primiero valley.

It's divided in three comunes: Imèr, Mezzano and Transacqua.

Valleys of Trentino